Jean Paul Ntsogo Boya  (born 23 September 1984) is a Cameroonian footballer who currently plays for Thermál Veľký Meder.

External links
Football Line-Ups Profile
FK DAC Profile

1986 births
Living people
Footballers from Yaoundé
Cameroonian footballers
Association football midfielders
Sahel FC players
Coton Sport FC de Garoua players
FC DAC 1904 Dunajská Streda players
MŠK - Thermál Veľký Meder players
Slovak Super Liga players
3. Liga (Slovakia) players
4. Liga (Slovakia) players
Cameroonian expatriate footballers
Expatriate footballers in Slovakia
Cameroonian expatriate sportspeople in Slovakia